Circle City is an unincorporated community and census-designated place (CDP) in Maricopa County, Arizona, United States, located  northwest of Surprise on U.S. Route 60. As of the 2020 census, the population was 522.

The development was built in the late 1950s by The Workmen's Circle, a Jewish fraternal and mutual aid society with roots in the socialist movement of the early 20th century, as a retirement community for its aging members.

References

Jewish socialism
Jews and Judaism in Arizona
Socialism in the United States
Unincorporated communities in Maricopa County, Arizona
Unincorporated communities in Arizona
Census-designated places in Maricopa County, Arizona
Census-designated places in Arizona
Secular Jewish culture in the United States
Yiddish culture in the United States